The Coup d'état of December Twelfth (Hangul: 12.12 군사반란; Hanja: 12.12 軍事叛亂) or the "12.12 Military Insurrection" was a military coup d'état which took place on December 12, 1979, in South Korea.

Republic of Korea Army Major General Chun Doo-hwan, commander of the Defence Security Command, acting without authorization from Acting President Choi Kyu-hah, ordered the arrest of General Jeong Seung-hwa, ROK Army Chief of Staff, on allegations of involvement in the assassination of former President Park Chung-hee. 

After Jeong's capture, 29th Regiment of the 9th Division, along with the 1st and 3rd Airborne Brigades, invaded downtown Seoul to support the 30th and 33rd Capital Security Group loyal to Chun, then a series of conflicts broke out in the capital. Two of Jeong's allies, Major General Jang Tae-wan (Capital Security commander) and Major General Jeong Byeong-ju (special forces commander), were also arrested by the rebel troops. Major Kim Oh-rang, aide-de-camp of Jeong Byeong-ju, was killed during the gunfight. 

By the next morning, the Ministry of Defense and Army HQ were all occupied. Chun and his fellow 11th class of Korea Military Academy graduates, such as Major General Roh Tae-woo, commanding general of 9th Infantry Division, and Major General Jeong Ho-yong, were in charge of the Korean military. Chun was supported in the coup and the subsequent consolidation of power by the powerful private club of military officials called Hanahoe.

The Coup d'état of December Twelfth and the Coup d'état of May Seventeenth ended the Fourth Republic of South Korea and led to the establishment of the Fifth Republic of South Korea. The coup, alongside the Gwangju Massacre, is the primary justification of Chun's 1995 arrest by the Kim Young-sam administration.

See also
 Coup d'état of May Seventeenth
 Gwangju Democratic Uprising
 History of South Korea
 30 September Movement

References

Further reading
Don Oberdorfer, The Two Koreas (Addison-Wesley, Reading, Mass, 1997, p. 121)
Young, James V. Eye on Korea: An insider account of Korean-American Relations. (Texas A&M University Press, College Station, TX) 2003. 

Military coups in South Korea
South Korea
1979 in South Korea
Fourth Republic of Korea
Far-right politics in South Korea
Conflicts in 1979